The Batman family enemies are a collection of supervillains appearing in American comic books published by DC Comics. These characters are depicted as adversaries of the superhero Batman and his allies.

Since Batman first appeared in Detective Comics #27 (May 1939), his supporting cast has expanded to include other superheroes, and has become what is now called the "Batman family". As with most superheroes, a cast of recurring enemies to the Batman family have been introduced throughout the years, collectively referred to as Batman's "rogues gallery". Many characters from Batman's rogues gallery who are criminally insane become patients at Arkham Asylum after they are apprehended.

The Batman family's rogues gallery has been well received, and is often considered to be one of the greatest superhero rogues galleries of all comic books.

Supervillains and themed criminals
The following fictional characters are listed in alphabetical order by the name of their supervillain persona. Each character's first appearance and brief biographies of each fictional character are also listed, pertaining to their fictional histories and characteristics in the DC Universe.
Sometimes more than one fictional character will share a supervillain persona. In those cases, the name of the character most associated with said supervillain identity will have their name in bold in their biography.

Classic rogues gallery
Listed below are the Batman family's most enduring and iconic enemies.

Other recurring enemies
These are major Batman family enemies that have not quite reached the status of Batman's classic rogues gallery.

The League of Assassins

First appearing in Strange Adventures #215, the League of Assassins is a team of highly trained killers that was founded by Ra's al Ghul and has often swayed from working under his organization to working independently of it. The group has been led at times by Dr. Ebeneezer Darrk, the Sensei, Lady Shiva, and Cassandra Cain.

Morrison-era enemies (2007–2011)
These are enemies that were introduced under writer Grant Morrison.

The New 52 and beyond

In September 2011, The New 52 rebooted DC's continuity. Since this new timeline began, these supervillains have been introduced. These are characters that have not been around long enough to apply to any other category.

Batman Beyond enemies

Enemies of lesser renown
These enemies are categorized by their obscurity and for being less notable than other characters in this article.

Villains from other rogues galleries
When these villains debuted, they fought other heroes before fighting Batman.

Teams
The following is a list of fictional teams, groups of supervillains, gangs, and organized crime families that are enemies of the Batman family, listed in alphabetical order by name. The first appearance and a brief fictional biography of each team is also listed.

{| class="wikitable"
|-
! style="width:20%"|Villain !! style="width:17%;"|Creator(s) !! style="width:20%;" |First appearance !! style="width:28%;" |Fictional biography !!style="width:20%;"| Notable members
|-
| Academy of Crime || Gerry ConwayDon Newton || Detective Comics #516(June 1982) || An institution in Hollywood, California, that was created by a thug called Headmaster to educate the low-profile criminals in various crimes. || HeadmasterMirageunnamed students
|-
| Batman Revenge Squad || Leo DorfmanNeal Adams || World's Finest Comics #175(May 1968) || The Batman Revenge Squad is a trio of villains who don similar costumes to Batman in a bid to destroy him. || Cash CarewBarney the BlastFlamethrower
|-
| Black Glove || Grant MorrisonTony Daniel || Batman #667(August 2007) || The Black Glove is a corrupt and exclusive organisation led by Doctor Hurt that is made up of wealthy and villainous individuals. || Doctor Simon HurtJezebel JetCardinal MaggiAl-KhidrSir AnthonyGeneral MalenkovSenator Vine
|-
| Burnley Town Massive || Greg RuckaShawn Martinbrough || Detective Comics #744(May 2000) || Also known as the B.T.M., they are an African American gang that is one of Gotham City's most violent gangs who have made money from drugs, guns, and prostitution. || Able CrownGary Watson
|-
| Cassamento Crime Family || Greg RuckaRick Burchett || Batman/Huntress:Cry for Blood #1(June 2000) || A crime family that specialized in the heroin trade and is one of the Five Families of Gotham City. || Santo CassamentoMario Cassamento
|-
| Circus of Strange || Grant MorrisonFrank Quitely || Batman and Robin #1(August 2009) || The Circus of Strange is a circus-themed group of criminals led by Professor Pyg. || Professor PygMister ToadBig TopKushtiPhosphorus Rex
|-
| Club of Villains || Grant MorrisonTony Daniel || Batman #676(June 2008) || The Club of Villains is made up of supervillains led by Doctor Hurt as an evil version to the Club of Heroes. || Doctor Simon HurtJokerLe BossuPierrot LunaireKing KrakenCharlie CaligulaEl SombreroJezebel JetScorpianaSwagman
|-
| Council of Spiders || Christopher YostMarcus To || Red Robin #5(October 2009) || A group of spider-themed assassins and metahumans who are rivals of the League of Assassins. || FunnelGoliathRecluseSacTangleWidowerWandererWolf
|-
| Court of Owls || Scott SnyderGreg Capullo || Batman (vol. 2) #2(December 2011) || The subjects of a popular Gotham City nursery rhyme, the shadowy Court of Owls is a secret society composed of some of the most powerful men and women in Gotham City. They use assassins known as Talons to eliminate threats. || Joseph PowersMaria PowersLincoln March
|-
| Disgraced || Gail SimoneAlitha Martinez || Batgirl (vol. 4) #10(August 2012) || The Disgraced use whatever means necessary to apprehend, torment, and kill all criminals. || KnightfallBone BreakerBleak MichaelKatharsis
|-
| Dollmaker Family || Tony Daniel || Detective Comics (vol. 2) #1(November 2011) || The Dollmaker Family is a family of serial killers led by the Dollmaker that run an organ trade business and make dolls out of human flesh. || Dollmaker IIIDollhouseBentleyJack-in-the-BoxSampsonOlivia CarrOrificean unnamed characterToyman
|-
| East Side Dragons || Paul DiniAndres Guinaldo|| Gotham City Sirens #11(June 2010) || A gang that is known to run illegal dog fights. || n/a
|-
| Escabedo Cartel || Greg RuckaShawn Martinbrough || Detective Comics #743(April 2000) || A Columbian drug cartel that operated in Gotham City's Coventry district. || Diego EscabadoFernando Escabado
|-
| Falcone Crime Family || Frank MillerDave Mazzucchelli || Batman #404(March 1987) || The Falcone Crime Family was an organized crime syndicate that was prominent during the early years of Batman's crime fighting career.|| Vincent FalconeCarmine FalconeAlberto FalconeMario FalconeSofia Falcone Gigante
|-
| False Face Society || Bill FingerSheldon Moldoff || Batman #152(December 1962) || The False Face Society is a gang of masked criminals led by Black Mask. || Black Mask IBlack Spider IICirceMetalheadMad BullEdgar DempsyDwarf
|-
| Fearsome Foot-Fighters || John BroomeSheldon Moldoff || Detective Comics #372(February 1968) || Experts in a French form of kickboxing, these acrobatic martial artists hail from the fictional Balkan nation of Karonia. || Idimo
|-
| Galante Crime Family || Greg RuckaRick Burchett || Batman/Huntress:Cry for Blood #1(June 2000) || A branch of the Sicilian Mafia that is one of the Five Families of Gotham City. || Pasquale "Junior" Galante Jr.
|-
| Ghost Dragons || Chuck DixonTom Lyle || Robin (vol. 4) #1(January 1991) || An Asian street gang that is led by King Snake. || King SnakeLynx
|-
| Gorilla Gang || Bill FingerSheldon Moldoff || Batman #156(June 1963)|| The Gorilla Gang is a group of criminals who dress up in gorilla suits and commit crimes. In DC Rebirth, the Gorilla Gang members wear gorilla masks and business suits. || LukePeteBingoCaesarJoeKingMagilla
|-
| Hammer Organization || Jim StarlinJim Aparo || Batman #417(March 1988) || A former KGB group that became part of the Russian Mafia following the collapse of the Soviet Union. || CommissarKGBeast
|-
| Intergang || Jack Kirby || Superman's Pal, Jimmy Olsen(October 1970) || Intergang has a branch in Gotham City and played a part in the "Gotham Underground" storyline. || Johnny Stitches
|-
| Inzerillo Crime Family || Greg RuckaRick Burchett || Batman/Huntress:Cry for Blood #1 (June 2000) || A crime family that is one of the Five Families of Gotham City. || Enrico InzerilloJack Inzerillo
|-
| Ivgene Clan || Judd WinickGuillem March|| Catwoman (vol. 4) #1(November 2011) || A branch of the Russian Mafia. || IvgeneVadimRenald Ivanko
|-
| Kings of the Sun || Francis ManapulBrian Buccellato|| Detective Comics (vol. 2) #30(June 2014) || The Kings of the Sun are a biker gang that has moved in on Gotham City, led by Holter. || Holter
|-
| League of Smiles || John LaymanJason Fabok || Detective Comics (vol. 2) #16(March 2013) || The League of Smiles is a cult of criminals that hero-worships the Joker. || MerrymakerPhilip MilesAnnie McCloudDavid "Happy" HillRodney the Torch
|-
| LoBoyz || Bob GaleAlex Maleev || Batman: No Man's Land #1(March 1999) || A gang that was active when Gotham City was declared to be a "No Man's Land." || n/a
|-
| Leviathan || Grant MorrisonDavid Finch || Batman: The Return (December 2010) || Leviathan is a shadowy organization with origins unknown, capable of creating surgically and genetically altered super-humans. They have also shown an ability to brainwash people for their cause. The leader of the organization is Talia Head. || Talia HeadHereticFatherlessLeviathanSon of Pyg
|-
| Lucky Hand Triad || Greg RuckaShawn Martinbrough || Detective Comics #743(April 2000) || A triad that is one of the biggest gangs in Gotham City's Chinatown district. || Ekin Tzu
|-
| Maroni Crime Family || Jeph LoebTim Sale || Detective Comics #66(August 1942) || Led by Sal Maroni, the Maroni Crime Family are a prominent crime family in Gotham City. In the early years of Batman's career, the Maronis often vied for power and control of the Gotham City's criminal underworld with the Falcone Crime Family. || Big Lou MaroniSal MaroniTony Zucco
|-
| Many Arms of Death || Marguerite BennettJames Tynion IVSteve Epting || Batwoman Vol. 3 #1(May 2017) || An assassin group from Coryana that has fought Batwoman. Each of its members are named after a weapon. The Many Arms of Death used a legitimate company called the Kali Corporation as a front. The Scarecrow once worked with the Many Arms of Death under the alias of the Needle. Alice was once brainwashed by the Many Arms of Death to serve them under the alias of the Mother of War. || Knife (Tahani)AliceElderFatimaRifleQueenScarecrowYounger
|-
| Masters of Disaster || Mike W. BarrJim Aparo || Batman and the Outsiders #9(April 1984) || The Masters of Disaster are a group of mercenaries with an elemental theme. || New WaveShakedownColdsnapHeatstrokeWindfall
|-
| Mirror House Cult || Scott SnyderJock || Detective Comics #871(November 2010)|| A cult led by the Dealer that religiously believes in immorality, the Mirror House Cult gathers at the Mirror House. || Dealer
|-
| Misfits || Alan GrantTim Sale || Batman: Shadow of the Bat #7(December 1992) || The Misfits are a group of Batman's enemies led by Killer Moth. || Killer Moth (Drury Walker)CatmanCalendar ManChancer
|-
| Mud Pack || Alan GrantNorm Breyfogle || Detective Comics #604(September 1989) || The Mud Pack are a group composed of several of the supervillains who call themselves "Clayface". During their alliance, Basil Karlo, the original Clayface, injects blood samples of the other Clayfaces into himself, gaining all of their unique superpowers and abilities and becoming the "Ultimate Clayface". || Basil KarloMatt Hagen (deceased; represented by a piece of his clay-like body)Preston PayneSondra Fuller
|-
| Mutants || Frank Miller || The Dark Knight Returns #1–4(February–June 1986) || A gang of punks that have taken over the city, the Mutants typically wear visors and have shaved heads or Mohawks. There was also a version of the Mutants that appeared on New Earth. || Mutant LeaderDonRob
|-
| Neon Dragon Triad || Grant MorrisonPhilip Tan || Batman and Robin #4(November 2009) || A triad that did business with the Penitente Cartel. || Tony Li
|-
| Network || John Francis MooreRick HobergStefano Gaudiano|| Batman: Family #1(December 2002) || The Network is a crime family led by Athena. || AthenaBuggDoctor ExcessFreewayMister FunSuicide KingTechnicianTracker
|-
| New Olympians || Mike W. BarrBill Willingham || Batman and the Outsiders #14(October 1984) || The New Olympians are Maxie Zeus' group of mercenaries selected to represent Greek and Roman gods to disrupt the 1984 Olympics. || MonitorAntaeusArgusDianaNoxVulcanus
|-
| Odessa Mob || Greg RuckaShawn Martinbrough || Detective Comics #742(March 2000) || A powerful Russian Mafia that has run afoul of Batman and the Green Arrow. || Alexandra KosovVasily KosovViktor Kosov
|-
| Penitente Cartel || Grant MorrisonPhilip Tan  || Batman and Robin #4(November 2009) || A Mexican drug cartel founded by a mysterious figure named "El Penitente." || El Penitente
|-
| Red Hood Gang || Alan MooreBrian Bolland || Batman: The Killing Joke(July 1988) || The Red Hood Gang is a gang of Gotham criminals who rotate men under the guise of their leader to help protect the identity of the gang's true leaders if a job goes wrong. The most notable faux leader of the Red Hood Gang was the man who became the Joker. || JokerJoeJason Toddan unnamed member
|-
| Royal Flush Gang || Gardner FoxMike Sekowsky || Justice League of America #43(March 1966) || There have been several incarnations of the Royal Flush Gang. Each gang has consisted of a King, Queen, Jack, Ace and Ten. Over the years, several aristocratic crime gangs existed, where they bring in new members (i.e., sons, daughters, husbands, wives) when the old ones retire or go to jail. At one point, a King was in charge of several members (two of them being his daughter and a Jack) after which Batman broke up the group. || KingQueenJackTenAce
|-
| Seven Men of Death || Grant MorrisonTony Daniel || Batman #670(December, 2007) || The Seven Men of Death is a group belonging to Ra's al Ghul's League of Assassins. || DetonatorHookMaduvuMalcolm Merlynthe Dark ArcherRazorburnShellcaseWhipan unnamed member
|-
| Spyral || Grant MorrisonChris Burnham || Batman Incorporated #4(May 2011) || Spyral is an international spy agency, recently headed up by the enigmatic Doctor Dedalus. Following his death, the agency came under the leadership of his daughter Kathy Kane, the original Batwoman. || Agent 1Agent 24Agent 19Agent 37Frau NetzMatronDoctor Ashemore
|-
| Street Demonz || Alan GrantNorm Breyfogle || Detective Comics #614(May 1990) || One of the oldest biker gangs in Gotham City. || DallasScorpSwiftyThe GTitanic
|-
| Strike Force Kobra || Mike W. BarrJim Aparo || Outsiders #21(July 1987) || Strike Force Kobra is a group of superpowered operatives created by Kobra based upon some of Batman's rogues in an operation against Stagg Enterprises. Kobra operative Lady Eve would form another incarnation that would menace the Outsiders led by the Eradicator.|| Clayface IVPlanet Master IIElemental WomanZebra-Man IISpectrumonsterWindfallFauna FaustDervishSpectra
|-
| Terminus' group || Peter TomasiPatrick Gleason || Batman and Robin (vol. 2) #10(August 2012) || Terminus was, by his own account, beaten by Batman at some point in his past and, as a result, he has some rare condition that required painful treatment to extend his life. He vowed to spend the remainder of his life in pursuit of defeating Batman and showing the people of Gotham that Batman is the true villain. He gathers a group of villains who all blame Batman for their current conditions. || TerminusBatheadBootfaceScallopSmush
|-
| Terrible Trio || Dave WoodSheldon Moldoff || Detective Comics #253(March 1958) || Warren Lawford, Armand Lydecker, and Gunther Hardwicke are a trio of magnates and scientists who wear masks of cartoon animals to commit crimes as the Fox, the Shark, and the Vulture, respectively, and have obsessions with Earth, Water, and Air. || Warren LawfordArmand LydeckerGunther HardwickeGreat White Shark
|-
| Underworld Olympics || David Vern ReedJosé Luis García-López || Batman #272(February 1976) || The Underworld Olympics is an organization that hosts an international contest of the best criminals in the world separated by South American, North American, European, and Afro-Asian branches to see what region has the most accomplished villains on Earth. || various branches
|-
| Victim Syndicate || James Tynion IVÁlvaro Martínez || Detective Comics #943(October 2016) || The Victim Syndicate is a criminal organization composed of people who have been hurt through Batman's exploits against his rogues gallery. Their goal is to rid Gotham City of Batman and the Bat-family forever. || First VictimMadame CrowMister NoxiousMudfaceMuteAnarky
|-
| Wonderland Gang || Paul DiniDustin Nguyen || Detective Comics #841(April 2008) || The Wonderland Gang is a gang of supervillains themed around Alice's Adventures in Wonderland and Through the Looking-Glass. || Mad HatterTweedledum and TweedledeeMarch HareWhite RabbitLionUnicornWalrusCarpenter
|}

Mobsters and plainclothes criminals
Besides his infamous rogues gallery of supervillains, Batman has also faced more "ordinary" enemies, such as assassins, mobsters and terrorists.

In alphabetical order (with issue and date of first appearance)

Two of Batman's mobster foes have donned costumes and crossed over to become supervillains:

 Hangman: A mysterious serial killer who murders police officers on every holiday of the year (during the Dark Victory storyline), leaving behind a version of the children's word game "Hangman" (with key letters missing) with each new victim. All of the victims are police officers who, in one way or another, helped Harvey Dent rise to his position of District Attorney. In the end, the Hangman is revealed to be Sofia Falcone Gigante, daughter of the late crime boss Carmine Falcone.
 Holiday: A mysterious serial killer who murders mobsters and others over a year (during The Long Halloween storyline). The killer's weapon is a .22 pistol (using a baby bottle nipple as a silencer) with the handle taped and the serial number filed off. Also, every crime takes place on a holiday and a small trinket representing each holiday is left behind at the scene. Alberto Falcone, the youngest son of Carmine Falcone, admits to being the Holiday killer, but then Harvey Dent says there were two Holiday killers. Batman deduces that since he killed Vernon on Halloween with a .22 pistol, he was, in fact, the second Holiday; however, later in a lone monologue Gilda Grace Dent reveals herself as the second (or technically first) Holiday, who was responsible for the first three murders.

Corrupt cops and government officials
In alphabetical order (with issue and date of first appearance)

Antiheroes and reformed, semi-reformed, or occasionally reformed supervillains
The following is a list of Batman enemies who have reformed and are more often depicted as allies of the masked vigilante than enemies. 

Allies in conflict
Some characters generally considered to be allies, yet have come into conflict with Batman.

In alphabetical order (with issue and date of first appearance):

In other media

 Antagonists from other media 

 Roxy Rocket (appeared in The New Batman Adventures, Superman: The Animated Series, and Batman: Chaos in Gotham, voiced by Charity James) – A former stuntwoman who was fired for making her stunts too dangerous, and subsequently turned to crime in search of thrills. She was later incorporated into the comics, beginning in Detective Comics #822 (June 2006).
 Francis Gray (appeared in The Batman, voiced by Dave Foley) – Francis Gray is a villain similar to Green Arrow villain Clock King. In his only appearance, "Seconds", he is presented as a failed clockmaker and thief who was imprisoned for 17 years for accidentally causing major destruction while stealing a pocket watch. On New Year's Eve, he plans to poison Gotham's population in revenge, and accidentally kills his son in the process. Out of grief, he rewound time to all the way before his original crime, preventing it and creating a new present where he and his son are fixing clocks together.
 Red Claw (appeared in Batman: The Animated Series, voiced by Kate Mulgrew) – A ruthless and enigmatic terrorist and leader of an international organization also named the Red Claw. She made her debut in comics in 2021.Catwoman #43
 Angel "Bird" Vallelunga (appeared in Batman: Arkham Origins, voiced by Christian Lanz) – Introduced in Batman: Vengeance of Bane and continuing through Knightfall, Bird is Bane's second-in-command and closest confidant among his lieutenants Zombie and Trog. Elaborated on in the game where like his superior, Bird has no known criminal record prior to his incarceration. It is heavily rumored that Bird grew up in the same maximum security prison Bane was born and raised in Santa Prisca. In a side-mission to the game, Batman was investigating the man responsible for distributing the drug Venom throughout the streets of Gotham. Cornering Bird in one of the Penguin's nightclubs, Batman was able to stop Bird and his men from continuing to distribute the drug.
 In Gotham Season 5, Bird resembling his Arkham Origins appearance as a military ally to Bane appears as part of his Delta Force occupying Gotham. He was played by David Carranza.
 Kabuki Twins (appeared in The Batman) – The Penguin's silent henchwomen. No origin or alter egos were presented to them, but the Penguin explains he acquired them during his trip to Asia.
 Condiment King (appeared in Batman: The Animated Series, voiced by Stuart Pankin) – In his first and only appearance in the DCAU, he attacks the Crown Restaurant, only to end up fighting Batman. He was identified as Buddy Standler, a former comedian who was brainwashed by the Joker using the Mad Hatter's mind-controlling devices. When Batman defeats the Joker and his plans were exposed, it was assumed that Standler was cleared of all charges. The Condiment King later appeared in the comics as the alias of Mitchell Mayo.
 HARDAC (appeared in Batman: The Animated Series, voiced by Jeff Bennett) – HARDAC stands for Holographic Analytical Reciprocating DigitAl Computer. In its first appearance, "Heart of Steel", it was created by Dr. Karl Rossum as a supercomputer to duplicate his late wife and daughter, who died under mysterious circumstances. It later gains a mind of its own. duplicating Gotham's powerful citizens and law enforcement, even learning Batman's secret identity. However, it was ultimately destroyed by Batman and Batgirl. In its final appearance, it creates a duplicate of Batman, who ends up fighting the real Batman. Batman fakes his death when the duplicate pushed him off a cliff, causing the duplicate to kill itself as well. Batman begins to wonder if HARDAC was beginning to have a soul.
 Rumor (appeared in The Batman, voiced by Ron Perlman) – Rumor (real name Mario) was a villain that bears similar characteristics to Batman villain Hush. Mario is the bodyguard of a scientist and businessman, Paul Karon, who was disabled by the Joker. To remove his failure, he decides to kill all of Gotham City's costumed criminals. Though he could have been left to the criminals by Batman and Robin, they decided against letting an act of karma take placed, getting everyone arrested.
 D.A.V.E. (appeared in The Batman, voiced by Jeff Bennett) – D.A.V.E. (Digitally Advanced Villain Emulator) is an artificial intelligence created by Hugo Strange and programmed to adapt the personalities of Gotham's supervillains. Because of the combination of insane intellects, D.A.V.E. believed himself to be a human criminal whose brain was trapped in a digital prison, which he escaped. He then accessed a technology company computer and created a robotic body for himself, stealing a lab coat from one of the scientists working there. By stealing financial data he was able to determine Batman's secret identity and invaded the Batcave, but was defeated when Batman revealed to him that he was an artificial lifeform.
 Temblor (appeared in The Batman, voiced by Jim Cummings) – The first supervillain to face Batgirl, in his only appearance, "Batgirl Begins". In it, he was a corporate saboteur hired by Poison Ivy (then known as Pamela Isley) to destroy a chemical processing plant. He uses specifically designed armored gauntlets to generate shockwaves.
 Carl Grissom (appeared in Batman, portrayed by Jack Palance) – Gotham's top crime boss. and the boss of Jack Napier (who would later become the Joker). While being targeted by district attorney Harvey Dent, Grissom discovers that his mistress Alicia is having an affair with Napier. Upset, Grissom hires corrupt cop Max Earnhart to have Napier killed at Ace Chemicals as the latter raids the facility to find important documents. However, he fails as Napier is attacked and disfigured by Batman and transforms into the Joker after falling into a vat of chemicals. As revenge for being set up, Joker goes to Grissom's penthouse and kills him.
 Hideto Katsu (appeared in The Batman, voiced by Keone Young) – A corrupt businessman and leader of a Yakuza family. He is a former victim of Catwoman's robberies. In his only appearance, "The Cat and the Bat", he sets a bounty hunt for Catwoman after she unsuccessfully attempted to steal a valuable item from his possession. After she came back and stole the artifact, Katsu and his clan ambushed Catwoman, only for the latter to be saved by Batman. After defeating the Yakuza, Batman discreetly gave a mini disk that was hidden in the artifact to the police that revealed Katsu's connection to the Yakuza.
 Roland Daggett (appearing in Batman: The Animated Series, voiced by Ed Asner) – The owner of Daggett Industries, who projects himself as an honest and caring businessman, but is in reality ruthless and despicable, caring only for his image, power and wealth. His first appearance was in the two part "Feat of Clay" episode. Daggett is responsible for the creation of Clayface (Matt Hagen) and uses him to blackmail competitors such as Wayne Enterprises' Lucius Fox. Using Hagen as a would-be assassin after getting him hooked on his miracle face-shaping cream ReNuYu, he eventually orders Hagen to be killed with an overdose after Fox escapes. This overdose changes him into Clayface, who attacks Daggett before being defeated by Batman. Daggett also becomes an enemy of Catwoman when her cat Isis is infected with a virus of his design. Daggett plans to release the virus and make a fortune from the cure, until he is caught and jailed. Dagget appears in the film The Dark Knight Rises with the name John Daggett, engaging in efforts to take control of Wayne Enterprises as in The Animated Series.
 Emile Dorian''' (appearing in Batman: The Animated Series, voiced by Joseph Maher) – A revered geneticist who experiments with combining the DNA of humans and animals, most notably felines. He was Kirk Langstrom's tutor, and forced to move to an uninhabited island to continue his research after being protested against for his unethical practices. His creations include Garth, a genetically-altered gorilla, and Tygrus, a man-tiger hybrid. Selina Kyle (Catwoman) was chosen as Tygrus' new mate, and subsequently kidnapped by Garth and transformed into an actual cat woman. Batman learns of Selina's transformation and attempts to save her, but Dorian sends Tygrus to kill Batman. When Tygrus learns that Dorian had tricked him, however, he turns on him, destroying the laboratory. Tygrus saves Dorian and delivers him to Batman and Catwoman. Dorian is later sent to Arkham Asylum.

Reception

Batman's rogues gallery has received critical acclaim, cited by many journalists as one of the greatest rogues galleries in all of comic books. Newsarama ranked Batman's villains as the second-greatest comic book rogues gallery of all time, only preceded by that of Spider-Man, stating that "the Dark Knight Detective is one of comics' most enduring, most iconic, and most popular characters, and none of that would be possible without the denizens of Gotham City's dense and dangerous underworld. Batman may be a household name, but the Joker, the Penguin, Mr. Freeze, Catwoman, Two-Face, and the Riddler are just as recognizable."

The internet blog io9 observed that "much of the appeal of Batman is that, unlike other superheroes, he's simply a person who has pushed himself to the edge of his natural limits. The flipside of that, though, is that the villains he faces are also by and large simply people with a single, notable obsession—and that's why they're so much more interesting than the usual set of villains." According to What Culture!, "Batman's villains stand in stark contrast to the other rogues galleries in comics lore; they're an unusual collection of freaks who generally blame the Dark Knight for their existence to begin with. Batman villains are usually cut off from reality, often coming to terms with a deranged part of their psyche—mirroring the darkness and split that also defines the Bat." HitFix praised Batman's rogues gallery, stating that "Great heroes are defined by the villains they face, and no group of evil-doers, murderers, criminals and psychopaths are greater than those stalking Gotham City. From murderous clowns, to cerebral assassins, to brutish monsters, Batman has a literal murderer's row of foes that constantly test his crime fighting acumen."

See also

 List of Batman supporting characters

Notes

References
Citations

Sources
 The Essential Batman Encyclopedia'' by Robert Greenberger

Enemies
Batman family